Sazova Park, officially Sazova Science, Culture and Art Park, is a park in Eskişehir, Turkey. It was established by the metropolitan municipality of Eskişehir in 2008.

Location
The park is in Tepebaşı secondary municipality, next to New Eskişehir Stadium at  It is quite close to midtown and there are regular bus services. Its total area is

The park
The park consists of several parts. In addition to restaurants and cafehouses, these are;
 Eskişehir Zoo (sponsored by Eti Company)
 Planetarium (sponsored by Sabancı Holding)
 Turkic science history building
 Scientific experiments building
 Esminiaturk (models of historical 1/25 size Turkic buildings, similar to Miniaturk in İstanbul)
 Japanese garden
 An artificial lake and a pirate ship
 Dream Château
 Miniature railway

Gallery

References

Science parks in Turkey
Amusement parks in Turkey
Visitor attractions in Eskişehir.
Tepebaşı District
2008 establishments in Turkey